Hindu atheism or non-theism, which is known as Nirīśvaravāda (Sanskrit: , , lit. "Argument against the existence of Ishvara") has been a historically propounded viewpoint in many of the Astika (Orthodox) streams of Hindu philosophy. Hindu spiritual atheists, agnostics or Non-theists who affirm Vedas and Brahman, as well as those who follow astika (orthodox) philosophies but reject personal god(s), are also called Dharmic atheist, Vedic Atheist or Sanatani atheist. In current Indian languages, such as Hindi or Bengali, āstika and its derivatives usually mean 'theist', and nāstika and its derivatives denote an 'atheist'; however, the two terms in ancient- and medieval-era Sanskrit literature do not refer to 'theism' or 'atheism'. In ancient India Astika means those who affirms vedas, atman and brahman while nastika by contrast, are those who deny all the respective definitions of āstika; they do not believe in the existence of Self or Ishvara (God) and rejects Vedas. Sometimes nastika philosophies are also considered as a part of Hindu philosophy because the word 'Hindu' is actually an exonym and historically, the term has also been used as a geographical, cultural, and later religious identifier for people living in the Indian subcontinent. Many Scholars consider the Nāstika philosophies (Indian 'Heterodox' Philosophies) like Buddhism, Jainism and Charvaka as distinct schools of philosophies while some others consider them as part of Hindu Philosophy.

There are six major orthodox (astika) schools of Hindu philosophy — Nyaya, Vaisheshika, Samkhya, Yoga, Mīmāṃsā and Vedanta. Among them, Samkhya, Yoga and Mimamsa, while not rejecting either the Vedas or Brahman, typically reject a personal God, creator God, or a God with attributes.

Some schools of thought view the path of atheism as a valid one but difficult to follow in matters of spirituality.

Etymology 
The Sanskrit term  ("pious, believer") refers to the systems of thought which admit the validity of the Vedas. Technically, in Hindu philosophy the term  refers only to acceptance of authority of Vedas, not belief in the existence of God.

However, even when philosophers professed allegiance to the Vedas, their allegiance did little to fetter the freedom of their speculative ventures. On the contrary, the acceptance of the authority of the Vedas was a convenient way for a philosopher's views to become acceptable to the orthodox, even if a thinker introduced a wholly new idea. Thus, the Vedas could be cited to corroborate a wide diversity of views; they were used by the Vaisheshika thinkers (i.e., those who believe in ultimate particulars, both individual souls and atoms) as much as by the Advaita Vedanta philosophers.

Historical development 
The Rig Veda, the oldest of the Vedas, deals with significant skepticism around the fundamental question of a creator God and the creation of the universe. It does not, at many instances, categorically accept the existence of a creator God. Nasadiya Sukta (Creation Hymn) in the tenth chapter of the Rig Veda states:

The Brihadaranyaka, Isha, Mundaka (in which Brahman is everything and "no-thing") and especially the Chandogya Upanishads have also been interpreted as atheistic because of their stress on the subjective self. In the Brihadaranyaka Upanishad (800BCE), early arguments were made against the emphasis on a personal god.

Mimamsa was a realistic, pluralistic school of philosophy which was concerned with the exegesis of the Vedas. The core text of the school was the Purva Mimamsa Sutras of Jaimini (c. 200 BCE–200 CE). Mimamsa philosophers believed that the revelation of the Vedas was sacred, authorless (apaurusheyatva) and infallible, and that it was essential to preserve the sanctity of the Vedic ritual to maintain dharma (cosmic order). As a consequence of the belief in sanctity of the ritual, Mimamsas rejected the notion of God in any form. Later commentators of the Mimamsa sutras such as Prabhākara (c. 7th century CE) advanced arguments against the existence of God.  The early Mimamsa not only did not accept God but said that human action itself was enough to create the necessary circumstances for the enjoyment of its fruits.

Samkhya is not fully atheistic and strongly dualistic orthodox (Astika) school of Indian Hindu philosophy. The earliest surviving authoritative text on classical Samkhya philosophy is the Samkhyakarika (c. 350–450 CE) of Iśvarakṛṣṇa. The Samkhyakarika is silent on the issue of Isvara's existence or nonexistence, although first millennium commentators such as Gaudapada understand the text as compatible with some concept of God. However, the Samkhya Sutra (14th c. CE) and its commentaries explicitly attempt to disprove God's existence through reasoned argument.

Arguments against existence of God in Hindu philosophy 
Mimamsas argued that there was no need to postulate a maker for the world, just as there was no need for an author to compose the Vedas or a God to validate the rituals. They further thought that the Gods named in the Vedas had no physical existence apart from the mantras that speak their names. In this regard, the power of the mantras was what was seen as the power of Gods. Mimamsas reasoned that an incorporeal God could not author the Vedas, for he would not have the organs of speech to utter words. An embodied God could not author the Vedas either because such a God would be subject to the natural limitations of sensory knowledge and therefore, would not be able to produce supernatural revelations like the Vedas.

Samkhya gave the following arguments against the idea of an eternal, self-caused, creator God:
 If the existence of karma is assumed, the proposition of God as a moral governor of the universe is unnecessary. For, if God enforces the consequences of actions then he can do so without karma. If however, he is assumed to be within the law of karma, then karma itself would be the giver of consequences and there would be no need of a God.
 Even if karma is denied, God still cannot be the enforcer of consequences. Because the motives of an enforcer God would be either egoistic or altruistic. Now, God's motives cannot be assumed to be altruistic because an altruistic God would not create a world so full of suffering. If his motives are assumed to be egoistic, then God must be thought to have desire, as agency or authority cannot be established in the absence of desire. However, assuming that God has desire would contradict God's eternal freedom which necessitates no compulsion in actions. Moreover, desire, according to Samkhya, is an attribute of prakriti and cannot be thought to grow in God. The testimony of the Vedas, according to Samkhya, also confirms this notion.
 Despite arguments to the contrary, if God is still assumed to contain unfulfilled desires, this would cause him to suffer pain and other similar human experiences. Such a worldly God would be no better than Samkhya's notion of higher self.
 Furthermore, there is no proof of the existence of God. He is not the object of perception, there exists no general proposition that can prove him by inference and the testimony of the Vedas speak of prakriti as the origin of the world, not God.
Therefore, Samkhya maintained not only that the various cosmological, ontological and teleological arguments could not prove God, but that God as normally understood—an omnipotent, omniscient, omnibenevolent creator who is free from suffering—cannot exist.

The Indian Nobel Prize-winner Amartya Sen, in an interview with Pranab Bardhan for the California Magazine published in the July–August 2006 edition by the University of California, Berkeley states:

Notable Hindu atheists 
Jawaharlal Nehru, famed Indian independence activist and first Prime Minister of India was described as a 'Hindu agnostic', and styled himself as a "scientific humanist".
 Brahmananda Swami Sivayogi was an atheist and rationalist who founded the organization Ananda Mahasabha.
 Vinayak Damodar Savarkar, was the president of Hindu Mahasabha, who founded and promoted the principles of Hindutva, a Hindu nationalist ideology. Despite this Savarkar was an atheist who saw Hinduism as a cultural identity rather than a religious one, Savarkar wanted to "minimizes the importance of religion in his definition of Hindu".
 Shreela Flather, Baroness Flather of Windsor and Maidenhead, the first Hindu woman in British politics. She has described herself as a "Hindu atheist". Broadly, she is an atheist with affinity to aspects of Hindu culture such as dress and diet.
Raj Patel stated in an interview with The New Yorker that he grew up a theist Hindu but is now an atheist Hindu.
S. S. Rajamouli, most known for directing Baahubali, Baahubali 2 and RRR, in a March 2022 interview he stated that "I don't believe in God or religion the way it is portrayed now.  if you ask me 'Do you believe in the existence of God?' I'd say 'I don't know'." Rajamouli said that he is not a Hindu in the religious sense, but considering it as Dharma, he is 'very much' a Hindu. "I am a follower of Hindu dharma", he said.

See also 

 Āstika and nāstika
 Śramaṇa
 Adevism
 Irreligion in India
 Nontheistic religion

References

External links 
 Lokayata/Carvaka - non-believers in ancient India
 Modern Hinduism, Atheism, and their philosophical roots

 
Religious atheism
Hindu philosophical concepts
Hindu philosophy
Irreligion in India